Sarsa is a village in the Bhiwani district of the Indian state of Haryana. , the village had 529 households with a population of 2,884 of which 1,588 were male and 1,326 female.

References

Villages in Bhiwani district